Qingtianping is a village in Yongshun County of Xiangxi Tujia and Miao Autonomous Prefecture which is in the north west Hunan province of China

References

Divisions of Yongshun County
Villages in China